139th may refer to:

139th (Northumberland) Battalion, CEF, unit in the Canadian Expeditionary Force during the First World War
139th (Nottinghamshire and Derbyshire) Brigade, infantry brigade of the British Army that saw active service in World War I
139th Aero Squadron, Air Service, United States Army unit that fought on the Western Front during World War I
139th Airlift Squadron, unit of the New York Air National Guard 109th Airlift Wing Stationed at Stratton Air National Guard Base, Schenectady, New York
139th Airlift Wing, unit of the Missouri Air National Guard, stationed at Rosecrans Air National Guard Base, St. Joseph, Missouri
139th Delaware General Assembly, meeting of the legislative branch of the state government, consisting of the Delaware Senate and House of Representatives
139th Georgia General Assembly succeeded the 138th and served as the precedent for the 140th General Assembly in 1989
139th Illinois Volunteer Infantry Regiment, infantry regiment that served in the Union Army during the American Civil War
139th Indiana Infantry Regiment served in the Union Army between June 5, 1864, and September 29, 1865, during the American Civil War
139th Intelligence Squadron, the newest unit of the Georgia Air National Guard, focusing on intelligence operations
139th Medical Brigade, a subordinate command of the 807th Medical Command (Deployment Support), headquartered in Independence, MO
139th meridian east, line of longitude across the Arctic Ocean, Asia, the Pacific Ocean, Australasia, the Indian Ocean, the Southern Ocean, and Antarctica
139th meridian west, line of longitude across the Arctic Ocean, North America, the Pacific Ocean, the Southern Ocean, and Antarctica
139th New York State Legislature
139th New York Volunteer Infantry Regiment, infantry regiment of Union Army in the early years of the American Civil War
139th Ohio Infantry, an infantry regiment in the Union Army during the American Civil War
139th Open or 2010 Open Championship Mark Calcavecchia
139th Pennsylvania Infantry, infantry regiment in the Union Army during the American Civil War
139th Rifle Division (Soviet Union), infantry division of the Red Army, formed three times during World War II
139th Street (Manhattan), New York
Connecticut's 139th assembly district, one of 151 Connecticut House of Representatives districts
Pennsylvania's 139th Representative District, located in Pike County, Pennsylvania and Wayne County, Pennsylvania

See also
139 (disambiguation)